Hajira may refer to:

 Hajira, Azad Kashmir, a town in Pakistan
 Hazira, a suburb and a transshipment port in India